Mutuma is a surname. Notable people with the surname include:

Bridget Mutuma, Kenyan nanotechnologist
Harry Mutuma Kathurima (born 1952), Kenyan diplomat
Nick Mutuma, Kenyan actor
Rodreck Mutuma (born 1988), Zimbabwean footballer

See also
 Mutuma Ruteere, former United Nations special rapporteur for Racism, Racial Discrimination, Xenophobia and Related Intolerance